Fumagalli is an Italian surname.

Geographical distribution
As of 2014, 89.6% of all known bearers of the surname Fumagalli were residents of Italy (frequency 1:1,799), 4.7% of Brazil (1:115,478), 1.8% of Argentina (1:62,399) and 1.2% of Switzerland (1:17,361).

In Italy, the frequency of the surname was higher than national average (1:1,799) only in one region: Lombardy (1:298).

People
Musical family
Adolfo Fumagalli (1828–1856), Italian virtuoso pianist and composer
Disma Fumagalli (1826-1893), Italian composer and music teacher
Luca Fumagalli (1837-1908), Italian composer, pianist and music educator
Polibio Fumagalli (1830–1900), Italian composer, organist and pianist 
 (1822-1907), Italian composer, music publisher, and music educator
 (1869-1936), Italian librettist, actor, and baritone

Other
Carlo Fumagalli (born 1996), Italian basketball player
Corrado Fumagalli (born 1967), Italian television presenter
Giuliana Fumagalli, Canadian politician
José Fernando Fumagalli (born 1977), Brazilian footballer
Michelangelo Fumagalli (1812–1886), Italian painter
Orazio Fumagalli (1921–2004), Italian sculptor
Renato Fumagalli (born 1945), Italian singer-songwriter, guitarist and actor
Troy Fumagalli (born 1995), American football player

References

Italian-language surnames
surnames of Italian origin